Viktor Leptikov is a Kazakhstani hurdler. At the 2012 Summer Olympics, he competed in the Men's 400 metres hurdles.

Competition record

References

Living people
1987 births
Kazakhstani male hurdlers
Olympic athletes of Kazakhstan
Athletes (track and field) at the 2012 Summer Olympics
Athletes (track and field) at the 2010 Asian Games
Asian Games competitors for Kazakhstan
Competitors at the 2009 Summer Universiade
People from Kyzylorda